Barbed Wire is a 1952 American Western film directed by George Archainbaud and starring Gene Autry, Anne James, and William Fawcett. Written by Gerald Geraghty, the film is about a cattle buyer who goes to Texas to investigate why the cattle trails to Kansas are blocked.

Plot
A cattle buyer, a federal agent, and a newswoman become involved in a railroad plot against the backdrop of a rancher vs. homesteader war.

Cast
 Gene Autry as Gene Autry
 Anne James as Gay Kendall
 Pat Buttram as "Buckeye" Buttram
 Leonard Penn as Steve Ruttledge
 William Fawcett as John S. 'Uncle John' Copeland
 Michael Vallon as Homesteader August Gormley

Production

Filming and budget
Barbed Wire was filmed December 10–20, 1951. The film had an operating budget of $58,874.36 
(equal to $ today).

Filming locations
 Alabama Hills, Lone Pine, California, USA 
 Pioneertown, California, USA

Soundtrack
 "Mexicali Rose" (Jack Tenney, Helen Stone) by Gene Autry
 "Old Buckaroo" by Gene Autry

References
Citations

Bibliography

External links
 
 
 

1952 films
Columbia Pictures films
Films shot in Lone Pine, California
1952 Western (genre) films
Films set in Texas
American Western (genre) films
American black-and-white films
1950s English-language films
Films directed by George Archainbaud
1950s American films